Hugh Alessandroni (August 2, 1908 – December 8, 1977) was an American fencer. He fenced for the Columbia Lions fencing team. He won a bronze medal in the team foil event at the 1932 Summer Olympics.

References

External links
 

1908 births
1977 deaths
American male foil fencers
Fencers at the 1932 Summer Olympics
Fencers at the 1936 Summer Olympics
Olympic bronze medalists for the United States in fencing
Sportspeople from New York City
Medalists at the 1932 Summer Olympics